SM Megamall, simply known as Megamall, is the third largest shopping mall in the Philippines and the thirteenth largest in the world that is developed and operated by SM Prime Holdings. It is located in Ortigas Center, Mandaluyong, Philippines. The mall has a maximum capacity of 4 million people.

History
Henry Sy Sr. through First Asia Realty loaned ₱1 billion from the Philippine National Bank and Citibank, an unprecedented amount at the time, in April 1989 to fund the development of SM Megamall. The mall began construction in 1989 and opened its doors on June 28, 1991. It is the third SM Supermall ever built by Sy after the SM City Sta. Mesa and SM City North EDSA. It also boasted the first ice skating rink, which was temporarily removed in 2009 but was replaced by the new skating rink at a new location in 2014, as well as one of the first trade halls, the Mega Trade Hall, in the country. The new skating rink was the venue for the speed skating and figure skating at the 2019 Southeast Asian Games.

In 2018, SM partnered with Cal-Comp Technology (Philippines) Inc. for the provision of its New Era AI (Artificial Intelligence) Robotic service robots stationed at SM Megamall by the first quarter of 2019.

Location
The mall is located in the Ortigas Center, one of Metro Manila's premier central business districts and shopping hubs, at the portion encompassed by Mandaluyong City. It stands along the main EDSA thoroughfare and Doña Julia Vargas Avenue. The mall is almost adjacent to the Ortigas MRT Station and EDSA Carousel's Ortigas station, as well as the Shaw Boulevard MRT station. The mall is also located to nearby malls such as the Robinsons Galleria, St. Francis Square, The Podium, the Shangri-La Plaza, and Starmall EDSA Shaw and landmarks such as the Asian Development Bank Headquarters, Saint Pedro Poveda College, University of Asia and the Pacific, BDO Corporate Center, The Podium West Tower and the San Miguel Corporation Headquarters.

Buildings
The mall currently has 968 shops and is separated into five buildings, namely Building A, Building B, Building C; Building D, which is also known as the Mega Fashion Hall; and the Mega Atrium.

Main Mall

The mall has two main buildings. Building A features the 12 digital cinemas on the third floor; a food court, events hall and the Toy Kingdom on the lower ground floor, art stores on the fifth floor, and other anchor tenants. It also features Forever 21 located on the second level of Building A. Building B features The SM Store, the Ace Hardware store on the lower ground floor, the Cyberzone on the fourth floor, the Mega Trade Hall on the fifth floor, and other anchor tenants. It has been expanded and has direct connections with the Mega Fashion Hall which opened in January 2014. The SM Supermarket is featured on both buildings. The bridgeway connecting the two main buildings of the mall contains several eateries.

Mega Atrium
The  Mega Atrium is an addition to the existing two buildings. The Atrium, completed in 2008, bridges the gap between Buildings A and B. It features Chapel of the Eucharistic Lord, a  Roman Catholic chapel located on the fifth floor, as well as various shops and restaurants. The atrium also features the Garden at Mega Atrium, an indoor garden located within the second floor, and also includes the Respira Café, a coffee and pastry shop offering European confectionaries.

Building C

Building C is a recent addition to SM Megamall that houses office space on the upper levels of the carpark and a transport terminal, which includes an integrated bus terminal serving the north of Metro Manila including CAMANAVA, Quezon City and further to Bulacan and Calabarzon. Formerly Building A's open-parking facility, it is located near EDSA to the west of Building A and was opened on October 11, 2011. The building also contains the  DFA CO NCR-East, the first passport office of the Department of Foreign Affairs in Metro Manila which opened in August 2012.

Mega Fashion Hall (Building D)

The Mega Fashion Hall is the latest expansion of SM Megamall. The Mega Fashion Hall also houses an IMAX Digital theater (which is also the eighth IMAX cinema in the country), a 56-seat Director's Club Cinema with butler service, an Olympic-sized ice skating rink (replacing the one removed in 2009 from the lower-ground level of Building A), an upscale food court (Mega Food Hall), and a 14-lane bowling center, the SM Bowling Center (also replacing the one removed in 2009 from the lower-ground level of Building A, now Toy Kingdom) . The fashion hall also features the BTS Pop-Up Store, located at the mall's third floor, and showcases over 400 BTS-branded products.

Time Sculpture
The Time Sculpture is a sculpture located fronting the Mega Fashion Hall. The sculpture was unveiled on August 2, 2021, and is designed by Filipino-American public artist Jefre Manuel Figueras, also known as JEFRË, and was made of stainless steel. The sculpture is part of the Baks "Box" Series, where he gives representation to people living in cities around the world, and resembles a man looking at his watch, which serves as reminder how time is important in our lives and to make use of time in traffic productively. JEFRË also converted the statue's head to a block, which connects the figures to surrounding urban architecture, and strengthens the image that people are a city's major component as the building blocks and the bloodline of the city.

Expansion

The addition of the Mega Fashion Hall building added 125 new retail stores, 90% of which are global brands and 10% of which are local retailers.

Mega Tower
A 50-storey  office tower, named The Mega Tower, is built next to the Mega Fashion Hall formerly occupied by an open carpark. The S-shaped tower is directly connected to the Mega Fashion Hall and will feature three levels of basement parking and multilevel parking. Groundbreaking began in March 2016, while the tower's construction phase began six months later on the same year, in September 2016. The tower was topped off in March 2020, and was opened in 2021.

Arquitectonica is the firm responsible for the architectural design, while Aurecon serves as the tower's structural engineer consultant and New Golden City Builders serve as the general contractor for the project.

Gallery

Incidents and accidents

2000 bombing
On May 21, 2000, a bomb exploded inside a restroom at Cinema 6 of the mall's movie theater located on the third floor. One person was killed and dozens were injured. Two of the victims sustained very serious injuries. The bombing occurred four days after the Glorietta 2 bombing which wounded 13 people. Seven years later, the 2007 blast in Glorietta injured 129 people, while leaving 12 people dead.

2013 incidents
January 26, 2013: A holdup and shootout occurred when the Martilyo Gang, a local criminal group specializing in robbing stores by smashing and stealing valuables using hammers, robbed a jewelry store in the department store on the first floor.
May 5, 2013: An explosion briefly caused panic at the foodcourt at Building A, with at least one reported hurt in a stampede before shoppers were able to calm down after learning the sounds were not gunshots. A siomai steamer was short-circuited and caused people to file out at around 7:25 PM

Fire incidents
June 29, 2018: A fire hit the under-construction SM Mega Tower near SM Mega Fashion Hall at around 7:30 PM. It was declared "fire out" at around 6 hours later, at 1:30 AM on the next day. The Metropolitan Manila Development Authority (MMDA) had announced in a tweet at 8:16 PM on Thursday that the blaze had already reached the third alarm. This meant that up to nine fire trucks should be deployed.
May 16, 2021: A fire broke out in Building C of the mall at 3:36 AM. The fire was put out 19 minutes later.
September 2, 2021: A fire hit the 27th floor of the under-construction SM Mega Tower around 10:26 AM, causing people in the building to be reportedly trapped.

See also
List of shopping malls in Metro Manila

References

External links

Shopping malls in Mandaluyong
Ortigas Center
Shopping malls established in 1991
SM Prime